Celebration is the third greatest hits album by American singer-songwriter Madonna, released on September 18, 2009, by Warner Bros. Records. The album features 34 songs spanning Madonna's career since signing up with the label in 1982. It also includes three new songs: "Celebration" which is included on all versions, "Revolver" which is included on the two-disc editions, and "It's So Cool" which is included as a bonus track on some digital two-disc editions. A fourth song, "Broken", was recorded for the album but not used; eventually it was released in 2012 as a limited edition promotional vinyl single for fanclub members. A compilation DVD release, entitled Celebration: The Video Collection, was released to accompany the album.

Celebration received acclaim from critics, who noted the vastness of Madonna's back-catalogue. The album debuted at the top of the charts in Belgium, Canada, Ireland, Italy, Mexico and the United Kingdom. Madonna became tied with Elvis Presley as the solo artist with the most number-one albums in the United Kingdom. In the United States, it debuted at number seven in the Billboard 200; in other nations, it also debuted within the top ten, peaking in the top three in most of them. The title track was released as the first single of the album. It became Madonna's 40th number-one song on Billboards Hot Dance Club Songs chart. "Revolver" was released as the second single from the album in some territories, but did not achieve significant commercial success.

Background and release 

On March 18, 2009, Madonna's publicist Liz Rosenberg announced the plans for the release of a greatest hits package by September. She also added that Madonna had plans to go to the studio and record new material for the album. The next day, Madonna's manager, Guy Oseary, asked fans on his Twitter for input regarding the track listing of the greatest hits album. It was later confirmed that she wrote three new tracks for the album, with Paul Oakenfold being confirmed as producer for two of the new songs. Attitude magazine reported in an interview with Oakenfold that the tracks he produced with Madonna are called "Broken (I'm Sorry)" and "Celebrate". He stated that the new music is "lyrically classic Madonna with an edgy modern sound." Her official website also confirmed the presence of the track "Revolver", featuring rapper Lil Wayne, when they announced the final track listing for the CD and DVD on August 26, 2009. With The Times, Madonna shared her thoughts on the release:
The song comes first. And all of those other things that people remember, the imagistic things, are secondary, or certainly not as important. But I think I’ve become pretty good at sussing out when people's opinions of my work are coming from what they think of me personally. You just have to do your thing and then let it go out into the world. The rest, you're not in control.

On July 22, 2009, Warner Bros. Records officially announced the release date as September 28, 2009 and confirmed the name of the album as Celebration through Madonna's official website. "Celebration" was released as the lead single on July 31, 2009. The compilation was available in a case of two, as well as a single CD. The songs on the album were digitally remastered and selected by Madonna and her fans, while covering the whole expanse of her career. A DVD release titled Celebration: The Video Collection was released which includes several music videos of Madonna that have never appeared on a DVD before, such as "Into the Groove" and "Hung Up", as well as the music video for "Celebration". The cover for Celebration was created by street pop artist Mr. Brainwash who is best known for "throwing modern cultural icons into a blender and turning it up to eleven". Celebration was made available for pre-order on iTunes Store on September 1, 2009, to coincide with the music video release of "Celebration". One-disc and two-disc versions are available, as well as an iTunes-exclusive deluxe video edition which adds thirty music videos from Madonna's videography.

Critical reception 

Celebration received a score of 84/100 at Metacritic, indicating "universal acclaim" from music critics. Sarah Crompton from The Daily Telegraph gave the collection four out of five stars and said: "Madonna's Celebration shows just how consistently she delivers the goods, with tracks such as 'Music', 'Ray of Light', 'Frozen' and 'Don't Tell Me'", with "only a couple of [songs] which feel dispensable." Eric Henderson of Slant Magazine gave the compilation four out of five stars and commented that "functionally, what Madonna and fans are really celebrating with the release of Celebration is the hard proof that Madonna's back catalogue is now so immense and so varied that she can release a behemoth, two-disc greatest hits package that shoehorns in 36 songs and still manages to significantly short-change the singer's legacy", though also noticing that "the album is missing songs, doesn't always include the right ones, [and] seems to have been sequenced by a not particularly intuitive Genius playlist." Tim Sendra from AllMusic praised that "the collection does a fine job of living up to the title — it's certainly a celebration of Madonna's career and includes some of the most celebratory and thrilling pop music ever created." While reviewing the two-disc edition of the album, he commented: "The 34-track double-disc Deluxe Edition has an easier time of it than the single-disc 18-track release does."

Rob Sheffield from Rolling Stone noted that "Celebration kicks off with pure bliss and never lets up. It's a dizzying, nonchronological spin through the Madonna years, years it makes you feel lucky to be living through. Her hitmaking genius is unmatched and [...] undiminished." However, Sheffield called the omission of "Angel" "just plain crazypants." Lean Greenblatt from Entertainment Weekly commented that the album "holds up surprisingly well". Joey Guerra from Houston Chronicle praised the album saying "every song on Celebration defines a moment in time, a radio sing-along, a twirl under the glitterball. It's a pulsing testament to Madonna's often-overlooked pop prowess, from the scrappy electro beginnings of 'Everybody' and 'Burning Up' to the retro-disco swirl of 'Beautiful Stranger' and 'Hung Up', still a hands-in-the-air highlight."

Alan Woodhouse from NME was unfavorable in his review about the compilation, reckoning Madonna's career as two distinct phases, them being her "80s output" and her later career, or "phaze two", summarizing by saying that "Madonna clearly thinks this collection represents a celebration of her longevity [...] in reality all it does it expose her more recent failings", though Woodhouse also called it "unfair to say Madge hasn't touched magic since 1990" before naming "Hung Up" and "Ray of Light". Douglas Wolk, from Pitchfork, reviewed the album in the same light, also comparing her early work with the later days, stating that "'Hung Up' is really the only song from the post-GHV2 period that's lodged in the American pop consciousness", concluding with saying that "[Madonna] deserves a retrospective more interesting than this haphazard piece of contract-filling product", though being positive about the opening sequence, calling that "incredibly strong, a convincing argument for her genius."

Commercial performance 

Worldwide, Celebration has sold about four million copies. In the United States, Celebration debuted at number seven, with 72,000 copies sold in its first week. It was present on the chart for a total of 12 weeks and was certified gold by the Recording Industry Association of America (RIAA) on November 23, 2009, indicating shipment of 500,000 units. In April 2010, the album got a boost in sales from the Glee episode titled "The Power of Madonna". The album re-entered the Billboard 200 at position 85 with sales of 6,000 and a 219% gain. In February 2012 after her appearance on the Super Bowl XLVI halftime show, the album again entered the Billboard 200 at number 24 with sales of 16,000 copies and a 1,341% gain from previous week. In Canada, the album debuted at the top of the Canadian Albums Chart, with sales of 17,000 copies.

In Australia and New Zealand, Celebration debuted at numbers eight and two on the official charts, respectively. It was certified gold in both Australia and New Zealand, by the Australian Recording Industry Association (ARIA) and Recording Industry Association of New Zealand (RIANZ), indicating shipements of 35,000 and 7,500 copies respectively. The album also debuted at number one position on the Gfk Chart-Track albums chart in Ireland, earning a platinum certification from the Irish Recorded Music Association (IRMA) for shipment of 15,000 copies of the album. In Japan, Celebration reached a peak of number three on the Oricon albums chart and was placed at number 47 on the Oricon year end rankings, selling 177,194 copies, and earning a gold certification.

In the United Kingdom, Celebration debuted at number one, selling 77,000 copies in the first week. It became Madonna's eleventh number-one release on the UK Albums Chart, tying her with Elvis Presley as the solo act with the most number-one albums in the British chart history. From 2009 to 2012, the album had three separate chart runs within the top 100 of the albums chart. It re-entered the chart again on March 1, 2015, at number 38 with sales of 2,476 copies, following the release of her single "Living for Love" from 13th studio album, Rebel Heart. The album was certified double platinum by the British Phonographic Industry (BPI) for shipment of 600,000 copies across the United Kingdom, and it sold 666,000 as of 2019 according to Official Charts Company.

The album reached the top of the charts in Denmark, Flanders, Germany and Italy, while in Austria, Finland, Netherlands, Norway, Portugal, Spain, Sweden, Switzerland and Wallonia the album debuted within the top ten of the official charts. In France, Celebration debuted with 21,484 units and it later received a platinum certification from Syndicat National de l'Édition Phonographique (SNEP) for shipment of 100,000 copies. It also debuted at number one on Billboards European Top 100 Albums chart, topping the chart for four consecutive weeks. Celebration was certified triple platinum by Federazione Industria Musicale Italiana (FIMI) for shipments of 150,000 copies. In total, Celebration sold over a million copies across Europe, earning a platinum certification from the International Federation of the Phonographic Industry (IFPI).

Singles 

"Celebration" was the first single from the compilation. A first preview of the song was added on the performance for "Holiday" on her 2009 leg of the Sticky & Sweet Tour. It was to be released to radio stations on August 3, 2009. However, the single leaked on to the internet, so the date was changed to July 31, 2009. The digital download was also released on this date due to the leak. Remixes of the song were released to dance clubs on July 24, 2009. "Celebration" received mixed reviews from contemporary critics. The song reached the top of the charts in countries like Finland, Italy and Sweden, while reaching the top-ten in other European nations. It became Madonna's fifty-fifth entry to the Billboard Hot 100 and her fortieth number-one song on the Billboard Hot Dance Club Songs chart.

On December 11, 2009, it was confirmed by Madonna's official website that "Revolver" would be released as the second and final single off the album in some territories. The digital maxi single was released in many countries on December 29, 2009, followed by a CD maxi single in the US in late January 2010 and a 12" vinyl single in early February 2010. Contemporary critics gave a mixed review of the song. Some praised the chorus line "My love's a revolver" while others felt that it was underwhelming and not on par with Madonna's previous songs. "Revolver" has charted in the lower regions of the official charts of Belgium, Canada, Finland and the United Kingdom while reaching number four on the Billboard Hot Dance Club Songs chart of United States. This was Madonna's last single of the 2000s.

The track, "It's So Cool", debuted on the official charts of Finland, Italy and Sweden at numbers 8, 20 and 30 respectively, due to digital downloads. 

"Broken", the fourth song recorded for the album but not used, was written and produced by Madonna and Oakenfold, with additional writing from Ian Green and Ciaran Gribbin. "Broken" was given to Madonna's fanclub Icon's official members as a free 12" vinyl, as a part of their membership in late 2012.

Track listing

Charts

Weekly charts

Year-end charts

Certifications and sales

Release history

See also 
List of European number-one hits of 2009
List of number-one albums of 2009 (Canada)
List of number-one albums from the 2000s (Denmark)
List of number-one albums of 2009 (Finland)
List of number-one hits of 2009 (Germany)
List of number-one albums of 2009 (Ireland)
List of number-one hits of 2009 (Italy)
List of number-one albums of 2009 (Mexico)
List of Ultratop 50 number-one singles of 2009
List of UK Albums Chart number ones of the 2000s

Notes

References

External links 
 

2009 greatest hits albums
Albums produced by DJ Frank E
Albums produced by Madonna
Madonna compilation albums
Warner Records compilation albums